This is a list of notable British people of Indian descent (British Indians).

Academia and medicine
 Jas Pal Singh Badyal, professor of chemistry, Durham University
 Sir Shankar Balasubramanian, chemist and Herchel Smith Professor of Medicinal Chemistry, University of Cambridge
 Baron Kumar Bhattacharyya, former engineer, professor of manufacturing systems at University of Warwick and founder and chairman of the Warwick Manufacturing Group
Dinesh Bhugra, professor of mental health at King's College London, former President of the Royal College of Psychiatrists and the World Psychiatric Association, and President-elect of the British Medical Association
 Jagjit Chadha, economist, professor and Director of the National Institute for Economic and Social Research (NIESR)
 Krishna Chatterjee, professor of endocrinology, University of Cambridge
 Rangan Chatterjee, medical doctor, author, television presenter and podcaster
 Dame Pratibha Gai, microscopist, professor and Chair of Electron Microscopy, University of York
 Hari Hundal, Professor and Chair of Molecular Physiology, University of Dundee
 Mukesh Kapila, diplomat, former civil servant and professor of Global Health and Humanitarian Affairs at the University of Manchester
 Dame Parveen Kumar, medical doctor, professor of medicine at Barts and The London School of Medicine and Dentistry, former President of the British Medical Association and the Royal Society of Medicine, and former vice-president of the Royal College of Physicians.
 Mayur Lakhani, medical doctor and President of the Royal College of General Practitioners
 Sir Ravinder Maini, rheumatologist, academic and professor at Imperial College London
 Yadvinder Malhi, professor of ecosystem science, University of Oxford
 Kantilal Vardichand Mardia, statistician
 Anand Menon, professor of European Politics and Foreign Affairs, King's College London
 Chaand Nagpaul, medical doctor and Chair of the Council of the British Medical Association
 Baron Narendra Patel, obstetrician and former President of the Royal College of Obstetricians and Gynaecologists
 Rahul Potluri, medical doctor and epidemiologist
 Sir Venkatraman Ramakrishnan, winner of the 2009 Nobel Prize in Chemistry and President of the Royal Society
 Babulal Sethia, medical doctor, cardiac surgeon and former President of the Royal Society of Medicine
 Aditi Shankardass, clinical neuroscientist, Harvard Medical School
 Simon Singh, theoretical physicist and popular science author
 Ashok Venkitaraman, cancer researcher, director of the Medical Research Council Cancer Unit and Ursula Zoellner Professor of Cancer Research, University of Cambridge
 Sir Tejinder Virdee, professor of physics, Imperial College London.

Arts and entertainment

Artists 
 Sir Anish Kapoor, sculptor
Poulomi Desai, photographer, sound artist and curator
 Siramdasu Venkata Rama Rao, painter

Media
 Naveen Andrews, actor
 Gabrielle Anwar, actress (father and grandfather had Indian ancestry)
 Mina Anwar, actor
 Vikram Barn, also known as Vikkstar123, Internet personality
 Samir Bhamra, theatre director
 Sanjeev Bhaskar, actor, comedian, radio commentator, Chancellor of the University of Sussex
 Alia Bhatt, actress
 Viveik Kalra, actor
 Karan Kapoor, photographer, actor, model, son of Shashi Kapoor and Jennifer Kendal
 Kunal Kapoor, actor, ad film producer, ad film director, son of Shashi Kapoor and Jennifer Kendal 
 Sanjana Kapoor, actor, theater personality, daughter of Shashi Kapoor and Jennifer Kendal  
 Upinder Randhawa, producer, director, actor, journalist 
 Jas Binag, actor
 Gurinder Chadha, movie director
 Ameet Chana, actor
 Anya Chalotra, actress (father of British Indian ancestry)
 Sarita Choudhury, actress (father and grandfather of British Indian ancestry)
 Bobby Friction, radio presenter
 Kulvinder Ghir, actor
 Neelam Gill, model
 Shobna Gulati, actor
 Krishnan Guru-Murthy, television presenter 
 Jasmine Dotiwala, television / radio presenter, reporter, producer, journalist, columnist
 Waris Hussein, film and television director
 Saeed Jaffrey, actor
 Avan Jogia, actor (father was British Indian)
 Indira Joshi, actor
 Juggy D, singer
 Katrina Kaif, actress
 Rani Khanijau, television presenter
 Rahul Kohli, actor
 Ismail Merchant, producer
 Jimi Mistry, actor
 Rhona Mitra (1976–), actress and model
 Neet Mohan, actor
 Naga Munchetty, television presenter and journalist
 Parminder Nagra, actress
 Kunal Nayyar, actor
 Archie Panjabi, actress
 Dev Patel, actor
 Himesh Patel, actor
 Upen Patel, model
 Aaron Phagura, actor
 Anita Rani, television and radio presenter
 Amber Rose Revah, actress
 Laila Rouass, actor
 Sunetra Sarker, actor
 Naomi Scott, actress
 Amit Shah (actor)
 Pooja Shah, actor
 Sonali Shah, television presenter
 Babita Sharma, television presenter
 Indira Varma, actor
 Mandip Gill, actress

Comedians
Nish Kumar, comedian
Paul Chowdhry, comedian 
Sanjeev Bhaskar, comedian
 Nina Wadia, comedian
 Meera Syal, comedian
Danny Bhoy, comedian
 Ahir Shah, comedian
 Hardeep Singh Kohli, comedian
 Paul Sinha, comedian, doctor and quizzer most known for starring in The Chase
 Adil Ray, British-Indian and British-Pakistani

Music
Jai Paul, musician
Anoushka Shankar, sitar player and composer
Kanika Kapoor, singer
 Swami, rap/rock band
 Tjinder Singh, lead singer of Cornershop
 Talvin Singh, dance musician
 Nitin Sawhney, dance musician
 Jay Sean, R & B singer
Kaikhosru Shapurji Sorabji, classical composer
 Panjabi MC, real name Rajinder Rai, dance music
 Rishi Rich, music producer
 H-Dhami, singer-songwriter
 Freddie Mercury, lead singer of the band Queen
 Veronica Mehta, singer
 Charli XCX, pop singer
Anthony Ghosh, DJ
Bally Sagoo, record producer 
Shri, musician
Susheela Raman, musician
Nik Thakkar, multi-disciplinary recording artist
Panjabi Hit Squad, Rav & Dee are Producers, DJ's and broadcasters for BBC Asian Network & BBC 1Xtra
Steel Banglez, record producer

Business and industry 

Amit Bhatia, businessman, owner of Swordfish Investments and Chairman of Queens Park Rangers
Anshu Jain, Head of Global Markets, Deutsche Bank AG
Anurag Dikshit, co-founder of PartyGaming
Ashish Thakkar, businessman and entrepreneur, founder of Mara Group, and Chair of the Global Entrepreneurs Council of the United Nations Foundation
Avtar Lit, founder of Sunrise Radio
Dheeraj Hinduja, businessman and chairman of Ashok Leyland
Dinesh Dhamija, entrepreneur and politician
Firoz Kassam, former owner of Oxford United F.C.
Gopichand Hinduja, billionaire and co-chairman of Hinduja Group
Gulu Lalvani, founder of Binatone
Kamel Hothi, Director at Lloyds Bank
Karan Bilimoria, founder of Cobra Beer
Lakshmi Mittal, Steel magnate
Nina Bracewell-Smith, non-executive director of Arsenal F.C.
Param Singh, entrepreneur
Sanjeev Gupta, billionaire and founder and executive chairman of Liberty House Group
Srichand Parmanand Hinduja, billionaire and chairman of Hinduja Group
Tom Singh, founder of New Look
Vikrant Bhargava, co-founder of PartyGaming
Neville Wadia, Bombay Industrialist, and philanthropist

Literature and media 
 Anita Anand, journalist and author
 Anushka Asthana, journalist and editor
 Yasmin Alibhai-Brown, columnist
 Lord Waheed Alli, television producer
 Gurpreet Kaur Bhatti, playwright
 Satyabrata Rai Chowdhuri, author
 Rana Dasgupta, author
 Vish Dhamija, author
 Janan Ganesh, author and columnist
 Krishnan Guru-Murthy, television journalist
 Mehdi Hasan, political journalist, broadcaster and author
 Sunny Hundal, journalist, political blogger
 Maya Jaggi, writer, literary critic and editor
 Manjit Kumar, author of mathematical and scientific interest
 Sir V.S. Naipaul, author and winner of the 2001 Nobel Prize in Literature
 Sir Salman Rushdie, author, writer and winner of the 1981 Booker Prize
 Sunjeev Sahota, novelist and winner of the 2017 European Union Prize for Literature
 Angela Saini, science journalist and author
 Sathnam Sanghera, journalist and author
 Sasthi Brata, writer
 Vikram Seth, author
 Nikesh Shukla, author 
Jay Shetty, author, podcaster and motivational speaker
 Tasha Suri, writer

Politics

Members of Parliament
 Mancherjee Bhownagree, former Conservative, second Indian MP in British Parliament
 Dinesh Dhamija, former Liberal Democrat MEP
 Parmjit Singh Gill, Liberal Democrat MP
 Piara Khabra, former Labour MP (deceased)
 Ashok Kumar, former Labour MP
 Seema Malhotra, Labour MP
 Lisa Nandy. Labour MP, current Shadow Foreign Secretary  
 Dadabhai Naoroji, former Liberal Party MP, first Indian MP in British Parliament
 Priti Patel, Conservative MP and former UK Home Secretary
 Shapurji Saklatvala, former Communist MP
 Alok Sharma, Conservative MP and former Secretary of State for Business, Energy and Industrial Strategy
 Virendra Sharma, Labour MP 
 Marsha Singh, former Labour MP
 Rishi Sunak, Conservative MP, current Prime Minister of the United Kingdom (first British Indian prime minister) and Leader of the Conservative Party
 Suella Braverman, Conservative MP and current UK Home Secretary
 Shailesh Vara, Conservative MP
 Keith Vaz, former Labour MP
 Valerie Vaz, Labour MP

Peers
 Kumar Bhattacharyya, Baron Bhattacharyya of Moseley, former engineer, government advisor and Labour peer in the House of Lords. 
 Shami Chakrabarti, Baroness Chakrabarti of Kennington, Labour Party politician, barrister and former director of Liberty
 Meghnad Desai, Baron Desai
 Tarsem King, Baron King of West Bromwich
 Bhikhu Parekh, Baron Parekh
 Adam Patel, Baron Patel of Blackburn
 Dolar Popat, Baron Popat of Harrow
 Diljit Rana, Baron Rana
 Indarjit Singh, Baron Singh of Wimbledon, Crossbench Peer in the House of Lords
 Raj Loomba, Baron Loomba, Crossbench Peer in the House of Lords

Members of Scottish Parliament
 Sandesh Gulhane, first male MSP of Indian descent
 Pam Gosal, first female MSP of Indian descent

Members of the Senedd
 Altaf Hussain, first AM of Indian descent

Members of European Parliament
 Nirj Deva, former Conservative MP and MEP
 Claude Moraes, former Labour MEP

Others in politics
 Raheem Kassam, conservative British political activist
 Neeraj Patil, Mayor of Lambeth

Sports 
 Naiktha Bains, tennis player
 Ravi Bopara, cricketer
 Michael Chopra, footballer, Newcastle United
 Yan Dhanda, footballer
 Isa Guha, cricketer
 Nasser Hussain, cricketer, former England captain
 Ronnie Irani, cricketer
 Jazz Juttla, footballer
 Monty Panesar, cricketer
 Kishor Patel, cricketer
 Mark Ramprakash, cricketer
 Harpal Singh, footballer, Leeds United AFC
 Vikram Solanki, cricketer
 Neil Taylor, Welsh footballer
 Simranjit Thandi, footballer

Others 
 George Edalji, barrister falsely accused of horse killing, defended by Arthur Conan Doyle
 Seema Jaswal, British sports journalist
 Dina Jinnah, daughter of Muhammad Ali Jinnah
 Atul Kochhar, Michelin star chef
 Zion Lights, British-born activist
 Sunand Prasad, architect, former RIBA president
 Balwinder Rana, activist
 Buck Ruxton, 1930s murderer, born a Parsi
 Saira Shah, journalist, daughter of Idries Shah
Sophia Duleep Singh, suffragette
 Karam Sethi, founder of JKS Restaurants

See also
 British Indian
 Immigration to the United Kingdom
 Indian diaspora
List of British Sikhs
 List of Indian Americans
 List of Indo-Canadians
 Indian (disambiguation)

References

Indians
Indian Britons
+
Indian diaspora in the United Kingdom
British